Broit un ehre ("Bread and Honour") was a Yiddish-language Labour Zionist biweekly newspaper published in Argentina from 1909–1910. It was launched towards the end of 1909. Broit un ehre was published by the local Poale Zion nucleus, which had been founded in 1907. Pinie Katz served as the editor of Broit un ehre, and León Jazanovich as its director. Jazanovich was a well-known Poale Zion leader, who had arrived in Argentina in July 1909.

Only seven issues of Broit un ehre were published, but the publication was noted for being one of the most prestigious of the Poale Zion movement.

References

1909 establishments in Argentina
1910 disestablishments in Argentina
Ashkenazi Jewish culture in Argentina
Biweekly newspapers
Defunct newspapers published in Argentina
Labor Zionism
Newspapers established in 1909
Publications disestablished in 1910
Jewish Argentine history
Secular Jewish culture in South America
Yiddish culture in South America
Yiddish socialist newspapers